Galdi (also Galde) is a village in the commune of Nyambaka, in the Adamawa Region of Cameroon, in the south-eastern part of the Adamawa Plateau.

Population 
In 1967, Galdi contained 182 inhabitants, mainly Fula people

At the time of the 2005 census, there were 1529 people in the village.

There is a Sunday market in the village.

Rock art 
A site with rock art has been discovered in the vicinity of the village, with more than 150 motifs, including stylised metal weapons, arrangements of cups, and other unidentified signs.

References

Bibliography
 Jean Boutrais (ed.), Peuples et cultures de l'Adamaoua (Cameroun) : actes du colloque de Ngaoundéré, du 14 au 16 janvier 1992, ORSTOM, Paris ; Ngaoundéré-Anthropos, 1993, 316 p. 
 Dictionnaire des villages de l'Adamaoua, ONAREST, Yaoundé, October 1974, 133 p.
 Narcisse Santores Tchandeu, « Découverte d’un site d’art rupestre à Galdi au moyen Cameroun », in Afrique : Archéologie & Arts, No. 5, 2009, p. 173-179.

External links

 Nyambaka, on the website Communes et villes unies du Cameroun (CVUC)

Populated places in Adamawa Region
Rock art in Africa